Michael or Mike Murray may refer to:
 Michael Murray (organist) (born 1943), American-born organist
 Michael Murray, lead character played by Robert Lindsay in the British TV serial G.B.H.
 Mike Murray (cricketer) (born 1930), English administrator, banker and cricketer
 Mike Murray (ice hockey) (born 1966), one-gamer in the National Hockey League
 Michael Murray, guitarist with Tim Walsh
 Michael Murray (director) (born 1932), American stage director, producer and educator
 Mick Murray (Irish republican) (died 1999), Irish republican activist

See also
 Mick Murray (disambiguation)